Hammer of the Honky Tonk Gods is the seventh album by Bill Kirchen. Bill explores where country music finds its origins in blues and bluegrass, and in the Western Swing of Texas and California honky tonks.

He is joined by Nick Lowe, Austin de Lone and The Impossible Birds (Geraint Watkins, Robert Treherne), and their influence is very much in evidence.  The title track is a loving tribute to the Fender Telecaster guitar, Kirchen's guitar of choice.

Track listing 
All tracks composed by Bill Kirchen; except where noted.
 "Hammer of the Honky-Tonk Gods" 
 "Rocks Into Sand" 
 "Get a Little Goner" (Bill Kirchen, Louise Kirchen, Sarah Brown)
 "Skid Row in My Mind" (Kevin "Blackie" Farrell)
 "Working Man" 
 "Soul Crusin'" (Joe New)
 "Truth Be Told" (Sarah Brown) 
 "Devil With the Blue Dress On" (Frederick "Shorty" Long, William Stevenson)
 "One More Day" 
 "Heart of Gold" (T. Johnson)
 "If It's Really Got to Be This Way" (Arthur Alexander, Donnie Fritts, Gary Nicholson)

Personnel
Bill Kirchen - guitar, vocals
Nick Lowe - bass, backing vocals
Cindy Cashdollar, Dave Berzansky - steel guitar
Danny Levin - fiddle
Austin de Lone, Geraint Watkins - keyboards, backing vocals
Robert Treherne - drums
Bucky Lindsey, Chris Gaffney, Dave Gonzalez, Lisa Best and the Git Gals - additional vocals

Trivia
In his live show, Kirchen has referred to track 11 (If It's Really Got To Be This Way) as a "secret bonus track" that is fully listed on the CD, and only the audience of his live show knows the "secret" that it's actually a bonus track, not a regular track.

External links
Proper Records review

2007 albums
Bill Kirchen albums
Albums produced by Paul Riley (musician)